The British Hill Climb Championship (BHCC) is the most prestigious hillclimbing championship in Great Britain. The British Hill Climb Championship was held every year from 1947 to 2019, and resumed in 2021. The 2020 season was cancelled due to the COVID-19 pandemic.

All British Champions have been British. The most successful driver in terms of individual victories is Scott Moran, with 163, followed by Martin Groves (104) and Roy Lane (91). Moran and Tony Marsh jointly hold the record for the most championships, with six apiece. Ken Wharton is the only driver to win four consecutive titles, while Marsh uniquely scored two hat-tricks in 1955-1957 and 1965–1967.

Venues
The following tracks are used in the British Hill Climb Championship. 

 Doune
 Gurston Down
 Harewood
 Loton Park
 Prescott
 Shelsley Walsh
 Wiscombe Park
 Bouley Bay
 Craigantlet
 Val des Terres

A number of other venues have featured in the championship over the years including Barbon, Bo'ness, Dyrham Park, Fintray, Great Auclum, Lhergy Frissel, Longleat, Pontypool Park, Rest and Be Thankful, Stapleford Aerodrome, Tholt-y-Will and Westbrook Hay.

Format

A major hillclimb may have an entry of more than 150 drivers, but the event is usually a qualifying round of more than one competition, and some drivers (especially drivers of less powerful cars) will not be entered for the British Championship itself. Those who are, and who record a time in the top twelve of all those eligible, compete in a "run-off" at the end of each set of class run (there are two such sets of class runs at each event). In a run-off, drivers tackle the hill in reverse order of their qualifying times, although where two drivers share a car, the slower qualifier competes at the start of the run-off session. The person who sets the fastest time receives 10 British Championship points, the second-fastest driver nine, and so on down to the tenth-placed driver, who gets one. The 11th and 12th-placed drivers, and any who fail to complete the course, receive no points. An extra point is given to any driver in the run-off who breaks the outright hill record as it stood at the beginning of the day.

There are usually 34 such run-offs (i.e. 17 hillclimbs with two run-offs at each), but drivers can only count their 28 best results towards their final points total. In 2004, Adam Fleetwood achieved the unprecedented feat of winning 28 rounds, and so had to drop all his non-win points. Even so, he won the championship by a huge margin: before taking account of his dropped scores, he had racked up 318 points, with the runner-up, 1997 champion Roger Moran, a long way behind on 176 points.

History

The early days
The first climb of the inaugural series was staged at Bo'ness, near Linlithgow, Scotland on 17 May 1947. It was one of five events in that year's championship, the other climbs being held at Bouley Bay, Craigantlet, Prescott and Shelsley Walsh. All but Bo'ness still host rounds of the BHCC. The inaugural championship, as well as the 1948 title, went to Raymond Mays, who proved he was still the force to be reckoned with that he had been before World War II. Sydney Allard won the title in 1949 in the self-built Steyr-Allard.

The 1950s
Although the 1950 championship went to Alfa Romeo driver Dennis Poore, from then on every title of the decade was to be won by a driver who had spent most or all of the year behind the wheel of a Cooper with a JAP engine. Ken Wharton started the trend, and became the only man to win four successive BHCC titles. In the mid-Fifties there were three successive titles for the near-legendary Tony Marsh, a man who would still be competing at the highest level of hillclimbing as the 20th century closed. And finally, another hat-trick of championships went to David Boshier-Jones.

The decade was also touched by tragedy, when Bill Sleeman was killed at Bouley Bay, Jersey in 1955.

The final round of the decade was held at Stapleford Aerodrome on 11 October 1959, an event won by David Good in a Cooper-J.A.P. 1,100 c.c.

The 1960s
Although the 1960s opened as the Fifties had ended, with Boshier-Jones taking the honours in his Cooper-JAP, the decade was to see a marked change in hillclimbing. One notable feature of 1960s climbing was the appearance of four-wheel drive, with several of the decade's championships being won by drivers in such cars, including two for Peter Westbury.

Mike Gray became the second driver to be killed at a BHCC round when he died at Barbon in 1964.

The 1970s
The Seventies saw two notable firsts: Roy Lane's maiden championship in 1975, and the first of 18 titles in the space of 22 years for Pilbeam drivers when Alister Douglas-Osborn took the honours in 1977.

The 1980s
This decade also saw the first championship to be won by a Gould driver, when Chris Cramer took the title in 1985. However, it was to be the late 1990s before the Pilbeam near-stranglehold on the BHCC would be broken for any length of time.

The 1990s
The 1990s continued and even intensified Pilbeam's dominance of the sport, with the first eight championships of the decade being won by a driver in one of the marque's cars. By the time Roger Moran clinched the title in 1997, Pilbeam drivers had won 18 of the 22 championships since 1977, a dominance rivalled only by the Cooper years of the 1950s and early 1960s.

However, change was afoot, and the 1998 championship went to a Gould driver, David Grace. The future CEO of Rockingham Motor Speedway stamped his authority on the championship with a hat-trick of titles as the 20th century closed. As of 2004, every champion since had been behind the wheel of a Gould.

The hillclimb world was shocked in 1995 by the death of one of its leading lights, when Mark Colton was killed in practice at Craigantlet. He thus became only the third driver to lose his life in the history of the BHCC.

A new century

The start of the 21st century saw a "changing of the guard" in the BHCC, as young drivers in lightweight cars made their presence felt at the highest level. Graeme Wight Jr dominated in 2001, and in June he broke the outright record at Shelsley Walsh that had stood for nine years. Almost a year later he became the first driver to break the 25-second barrier at the track, winning a prize of £1,000.

The 2001 season was severely disrupted by the foot and mouth crisis that year, which caused the postponement of some rounds of the series, though only one climb - at Barbon - was actually cancelled entirely, and co-operation between event organisers and local landowners meant that spectators continued to be admitted to the meetings, albeit with precautions such as the disinfecting of cars entering the car parks.

A little later in the decade, once Adam Fleetwood had proved that he could translate his exploits in smaller cars to the top class, Wight Jr began to come under intense pressure, and by 2004 Fleetwood usually had the better of their battles. That season's championship was robbed of a classic battle for the title when Wight Jr pulled out in June to wait for the arrival of a new car - this had still not been driven in anger by the end of the year. However, crowds around the country could console themselves by watching a true master of the hills at work. Fleetwood won all but six of the year's 34 BHCC rounds, breaking hill records for fun - and in turn became the first person to climb Shelsley in under 24 seconds.

Fleetwood's announcement in April 2005 that other commitments would prevent his defending his title meant once again that the two most successful drivers of the 2000s would not go head-to-head, and the stage seemed set for Wight Jr to regain his crown, although his new V10 Predator proved unreliable, allowing the impressive Martin Groves to open up a lead at the top of the points table; Groves had the championship wrapped up by early August. With Wight Jr still nowhere to be seen, Groves retained the title in 2006, although he had to wait a month longer than in the previous year thanks to a spirited challenge from Scott Moran. Groves again held off Moran's charge in 2007 to complete a hat-trick of titles, but in 2008 Moran took his first championship win, retaining his title in 2009.

Moran has since won a further five titles, and his Gould GR61X (by far the most successful car in the history of the championship, with over 170 run-off wins) has won a total of seven. After several seasons in a supercharged Suzuki Hayabusa-engined DJ Firehawk, Alex Summers co-drove the GR61X with Moran and became champion in it at his first attempt.

Pirelli developed a new tyre for British hillclimbing in 2019, giving Avon its first rival in the 21st century. (Avon responded by introducing its new Hillclimb GT Super Soft Compound tyre on 4 June 2020.) Several drivers made the switch, including that year's Champion Wallace Menzies. Driving a Gould GR59 with a 3.3-litre V8 engine derived from the Cosworth XD, Menzies made it mathematically impossible for anyone to catch him after Round 27 (of 34) at Gurston Down on 25 August 2019. He became only the second Scottish driver to win the title after Graeme Wight Jr.

Since 1998, the only non-Gould driver to win the championship has been Trevor Willis, who did so in 2012 with his OMS 25, a less powerful but lighter car with a V8 engine derived from two Hayabusa units, and again in 2017 and 2018 with a similar but updated OMS 28.

2020 cancellation

Restrictions brought into force during the COVID-19_pandemic made it impossible to run events in the early part of 2020. Attempts were then made to organise a 'foreshortened' championship with rounds at five venues held over seven weekends starting in August. On 12 June, however, the Bugatti Owners' Club announced that, while it intended to reintroduce events at Prescott, it would not host a British championship event that season. This prompted the cancellation of the 2020 championship and an announcement that the organisers would now focus on the 2021 season.

2021 season

The 2021 British Hillclimb Championship presented by Avon Tyres was won by 2019 (and reigning) Champion Wallace Menzies.

Champions

Footnotes

External links
 Uphill Racers, Resource & Forum for British Speed Hillclimbing.
 Zipp Photography, Photographic and Video coverage of the BHCC.

Hillclimbing series
Hillclimb Championship
Recurring sporting events established in 1947
1947 establishments in the United Kingdom
National championships in the United Kingdom